The Icarus Hunt is a science fiction novel by American writer Timothy Zahn. It was first published in hardcover in August 1999, and was released in paperback in July 2000. It is an homage to the thriller novels of Alistair MacLean.

Plot summary
Prior to delivering a cargo to the nearby planet Xathru, Jordan McKell, a smuggler for a crime lord nicknamed Brother John and his shadowy boss, Mr. Antoniewicz, is on the planet Meima with his partner, Ixil, a member of an alien species called the Kalixiri. McKell is offered a job by a man named Alexander Borodin, whom he recognizes as the famous industrialist and sometime-archaeologist Arno Cameron. Cameron wants McKell to pilot the ship Icarus, which is carrying a very important cargo in its sealed storage core, to Earth.

McKell accepts the job and instructs Ixil to continue on to Xathru, intending to pick him up there. He and Ixil theorize that Cameron's archaeological dig on Meima had uncovered an advanced, alien stardrive, which he intends to be brought to Earth by the Icarus. While waiting to board the Icarus, McKell becomes acquainted with the rest of the Icarus rag-tag crew, all of whom are complete strangers to him and to each other. At the last minute, they are informed that Cameron is unable to accompany them, and are forced to set out on their voyage without their employer.

One of the crewers is killed in an accident a few hours later, and a series of other bizarre occurrences leads McKell to believe that they have a saboteur aboard; he begins keeping a wary eye on the crew. He stops as planned on Xathru to pick up Ixil and contact Brother John, who gives him a reluctant go-ahead to carry on with the voyage. While on Xathru, he is assaulted by a pair of strange aliens who say they want the Icarus''' cargo.

McKell escapes and pilots the Icarus to a planet called Dorscind's World. Convinced that the Icarus is carrying something far more important than he'd originally supposed, and that they are being hunted, he lands the Icarus under a false name. He then attempts to make contact with his benefactor, "Uncle Arthur", both to inform him of his current situation and to get information from him about his crewmembers and about Cameron's activities. Before he can get a call through, he is confronted by an old acquaintance, who tells him that there is now a reward out for knowledge of his whereabouts and attempts to extort money from him in exchange for not turning him in.

McKell realizes that the Icarus is being hunted by the Patth (an alien race who have a near-monopoly on the galaxy's shipping industry, due to their unique stardrives, which are several times faster than those of any other race). He becomes suspicious that the Icarus isn't carrying the recently discovered alien stardrive; instead, he thinks the Icarus itself is the alien stardrive. If this stardrive were to remain outside Patth hands, it could spell the doom of the Patth economic empire.

There are more scattered sabotage incidents aboard the ship, leading McKell to believe that one of the crewers is a Patth agent. He requests background information on all of them from Uncle Arthur, which is delivered to him when the ship stops at the planet Morsh Pon. McKell and Ixil discover that the ship's computer tech, Tera, is in fact the daughter of Arno Cameron. They also discover that Cameron himself had been aboard the ship, hidden in the area between the inner and outer hulls; he had unexpectedly jumped ship, however, during one of the fuel stops.

The Icarus successfully evades an attack off the planet Utheno, and McKell decides to make a break for Earth, outrunning the Patth by using the alien stardrive. This requires dismantling a good deal of the ship; while exploring deep inside the Icarus interior, McKell discovers by accident that the Icarus is not a stardrive at all; it is actually a stargate (a hitherto-theoretical interstellar-teleportation device), and Arno Cameron, instead of jumping ship as they had supposed, had instead been temporarily stuck at the stargate's other end.

A forced landing on the planet Palmary leads to McKell being captured by the Patth; he is rescued, however, by some of the crew. They decide to take temporary refuge at the isolated planet Beyscrim. There, they are confronted by Antoniewicz, and it is revealed that Antoniewicz, through the crewmember Everett, had engineered most of the sabotage incidents, believing that McKell was no longer loyal to him and intending to bring him back into line. Then, recognizing the Icarus' value, he had decided to take it for himself, and maneuvered the Icarus and its crew into coming to Beyscrim.

Antoniewicz's plans are thwarted, however, with the arrival of a Kalixiri commando force that had been sent by Uncle Arthur. In the end, McKell reveals that he and Ixil are not smugglers, but instead members of a military intelligence organization who had been assigned to infiltrate Antoniewicz's operation. McKell had been on Meima under orders from Uncle Arthur, his superior, to find Cameron and help him out of whatever trouble he was in, with taking the job as the Icarus pilot a maneuver to that end; landing the Icarus on Beyscrim had merely been bait to bring Antoniewicz out of his cover.

The book concludes with the crew celebrating their rescue, while Cameron makes plans for smuggling the Icarus back to Earth for research.

A secondary plot thread (and a complication of the main plot) involves a chemical dependency (possibly related to a rare and fatal neurological disease) of one of the crewmen.

Characters
 Jordan McKell, the main protagonist. A skilled pilot, he is also a major in the EarthGuard Military Intelligence unit, and has been assigned to work undercover inside the galaxy's crime rings and smuggling operations. He has been in intelligence for twelve years.
 Ixil T'adee, McKell's long-time partner, a colonel in the Kalixiri Special Command. He acts as a mechanic aboard the Icarus.
 Arthur Graym-Barker, or Uncle Arthur a former intelligence operative and the director of the unit to which McKell and Ixil belong.
 Arno Cameron, a well-known archaeologist and owner of the Icarus.
 Elaina Tera Cameron, the daughter of Arno Cameron; the computer technician aboard the Icarus.
 Johnston Scotto Ryland, or Brother John, Antoniewicz's second-in-command.
 Mr. Antoniewicz, the kingpin of the large smuggling operation which McKell and Ixil infiltrated. His first name is unknown.
 Almont Nicabar, the engine technician on the Icarus. He is a former EarthGuard Marine.
 Chort, the only alien member of the Icarus' original crew. He is a Craea, a species with a talent for spacewalking
 Hayden Everett, the ship's doctor, and an agent for the Antoniewicz organization.
 Geoff Shawn, the Icarus' electrician.
 Jaeger Jones', the Icarus' mechanic.

Reception
Roland Green of Booklist called the book "one of the better novels in some time for readers moving from Star Wars and its clones to other sf". Jackie Cassada of Library Journal called it a "good choice for most sf collections." Don D'Ammassa of the Science Fiction Chronicle called it an "old fashioned space opera in the very best sense of the term".

John Foyston of The Oregonian wrote that the "characters are lifelike if not fully dimensional." John R. Alden of The Plain Dealer wrote that the book is "about as original as a bologna sandwich". Brad Skillman of the Associated Press'' wrote that the book is "not very deep", contains "quite a few plot aggravations" and called the ending a "tad manipulative".

References

External links
 Review of The Icarus Hunt on SFSite.com

Novels by Timothy Zahn
1999 American novels
American science fiction novels
Bantam Spectra books